The Grafton Flour Mill is a former grist mill on the Milwaukee River in Grafton, Wisconsin, United States. The original section was built in 1846 by a group of Yankee farmers as a flour mill and produced flour for many years through a succession of owners. 

In 1884, the mill caught fire and had to be partially rebuilt. The owner went bankrupt after the fire and sold the mill to the White Lily Flour company.

During the Great Depression it was bought by the neighboring Badger Worsted Mill and was converted to produce worsted yarn. The company left Grafton in 1980, but the building still houses a yarn store, which began as the Badger Worsted Company's factory store, but is now independently owned. The building also houses a coffeeshop, offices, and studios. On June 30, 1983, it was added to the National Register of Historic Places.

References

Grinding mills on the National Register of Historic Places in Wisconsin
Buildings and structures in Ozaukee County, Wisconsin
Flour mills in the United States
Textile mills in the United States
Limestone buildings in the United States
Industrial buildings completed in 1847
Grinding mills in Wisconsin
1847 establishments in Wisconsin Territory
National Register of Historic Places in Ozaukee County, Wisconsin

Dams
Dams in the United States
Dams in Wisconsin